Marilyn Nicole "Nicky" Cabrera is a Salvadoran footballer who plays as a left-back for Salvadoran club Alianza FC and the El Salvador national team.

Early life
Cabrera was raised in Santa Clarita, California.

High school and college career
Cabrera's high school and college career was entirely in her hometown. She has attended the Golden Valley High School and the College of the Canyons.

Club career
On 11 February 2021, Cabrera signed with Alianza FC in El Salvador.

International career
Cabrera made her senior debut for El Salvador on 8 April 2021.

See also
List of El Salvador women's international footballers

References

External links
 
 

1997 births
Living people
Salvadoran women's footballers
Women's association football fullbacks
Alianza F.C. footballers
El Salvador women's international footballers
Sportspeople from Santa Clarita, California
Soccer players from California
American women's soccer players
College of the Canyons alumni
College women's soccer players in the United States
American sportspeople of Salvadoran descent